Vladimir Kamantsev (born 12 May 1979) is a Russian sledge hockey player. In the 2014 Winter Paralympics, he won the silver medal in the men's sledge hockey tournament with Russia.

References

1979 births
Living people
Russian sledge hockey players
Paralympic sledge hockey players of Russia
Paralympic silver medalists for Russia
Ice sledge hockey players at the 2014 Winter Paralympics
Medalists at the 2014 Winter Paralympics
Paralympic medalists in sledge hockey
Sportspeople from Izhevsk